Isaquias Queiroz dos Santos (born 3 January 1994) is a Brazilian sprint canoeist who has competed since 2005. He is the only Brazilian athlete to ever win three medals in a single edition of the Olympic Games, and the third most decorated Brazilian athlete with four medals overall, including a gold medal. 

He's been through adversity in his younger years. As a toddler, he poured boiling water on himself and spent a month in the hospital recovering. At the age of 5, he was kidnapped and offered up for adoption before being rescued by his mother, and five years later, he fell out of a tree while trying to catch a snake and lost a kidney.

Career 
Isaquias Queiroz is the first Brazilian sprint canoeist to win a medal at ICF Canoe Sprint World Championships. His first medal was a bronze medal at the 2013 ICF Canoe Sprint World Championships in C–1 1000 event, and his first gold medal was in the C-1 500 event in the same year. Up to the 2022 ICF Canoe Sprint World Championships, Queiroz has already conquered 14 medals in World Championships, seven gold medals.

2016 Olympic Games 
During the 2016 Summer Olympics, Queiroz won three Olympic medals at a single Games: two silver and one bronze. In the C–1 1000 metres event, he finished second, defeated only by Sebastian Brendel, who successfully defended his title. In the process, he became the first Brazilian sprint canoeist to win an Olympic medal. Two days later, he took the bronze medal in the C–1 200 metres event when Yuriy Cheban and Valentin Demyanenko were faster than him. Together with Erlon Silva, they won the silver medal during the last day of canoe sprint competitions in the C–2 1000 metres category. Queiroz was the first Brazilian athlete in history to win three medals at a single edition of the Olympic Games and the first sprint canoe athlete from any nationality to do so in the history of the Olympics.

2021 Olympic Games 
The 2020 Summer Olympics had Queiroz partnered with Jacky Godmann as Erlon Silva had not recovered from a hip injury. In the C–2 1000 metres category, Queiroz and Godmann finished in fourth place. Queiroz won the gold in his remaining race, the C-1 1000 meters. He considered a consolidation of extensive training to get a victory that eluded him in Rio and became the first Brazilian Olympic champion in canoeing.

References

External links 

1994 births
Brazilian male canoeists
Living people
Sportspeople from Bahia
Canoeists at the 2010 Summer Youth Olympics
Canoeists at the 2015 Pan American Games
Pan American Games gold medalists for Brazil
Pan American Games silver medalists for Brazil
Canoeists at the 2016 Summer Olympics
Canoeists at the 2020 Summer Olympics
Olympic canoeists of Brazil
Medalists at the 2016 Summer Olympics
Medalists at the 2020 Summer Olympics
Olympic medalists in canoeing
Olympic gold medalists for Brazil
Olympic silver medalists for Brazil
Olympic bronze medalists for Brazil
Pan American Games medalists in canoeing
ICF Canoe Sprint World Championships medalists in Canadian
Medalists at the 2015 Pan American Games
21st-century Brazilian people